The Alkmaarderhout is a football stadium in Alkmaarderhout, a city park in Alkmaar, North Holland, Netherlands. It was used from 1948 until 2006, when it was replaced by the AFAS Stadion.

The Alkmaarderhout was the home ground of Eredivisie side AZ Alkmaar. The stadium had a capacity of 8,914 people. In 2006, it was replaced by the new, state-of-the-art AFAS Stadion (then known as the DSB Stadion) and it was knocked down later that year. The final game at the Alkmaarderhout was an exhibition game between two AZ sides, one captained by Michael Buskermolen and the other by Barry van Galen, both of whom retired after that game.

References 

AZ Alkmaar
Sports venues in Alkmaar
Sports venues completed in 1948
Defunct football venues in the Netherlands
Multi-purpose stadiums in the Netherlands
Urban public parks